James Murdoch (born 1972) is a British-American businessman.

James Murdoch may also refer to:

 James Edward Murdoch (1811–1893), American actor and elocutionist
 James Murdoch (architect) (1844–1914), American architect in Denver, Colorado
 James Murdoch Sr. (1851–1925), Australian politician
 James Murdoch (Scottish Orientalist) (1856–1921), Scottish Orientalist scholar and journalist
 James Murdoch (New South Wales politician) (1867–1939), Australian politician
 James Murdoch Jr. (1886–1935), Australian politician
 James Murdoch (music advocate) (1930–2010), Australian arts administrator, musicologist, composer, journalist, broadcaster
 James Murdock (actor) (1931–1981), American actor
 James Murdoch (singer), Canadian rock musician and producer

See also
 James Murdock (disambiguation)